The Untouchables is a 1987 American crime film directed by Brian De Palma, produced by Art Linson, and written by David Mamet. The film is loosely based on the book of the same name (1957) and the real-life events it was based on, but most of its plot is fictionalized. The film stars Kevin Costner, Charles Martin Smith, Andy García, Robert De Niro (in the third collaboration between De Palma and De Niro, following 1968's Greetings and 1970's Hi, Mom!), and Sean Connery, and follows Eliot Ness (Costner) as he forms the Untouchables team to bring Al Capone (De Niro) to justice during Prohibition. The Grammy Award–nominated score was composed by Ennio Morricone and features period music by Duke Ellington.

The Untouchables premiered on June 2, 1987, in New York City, and went into general release on June 3, 1987, in the United States. The film grossed $106.2 million worldwide and received generally positive reviews from critics. It was nominated for four Academy Awards; Connery won the Academy Award for Best Supporting Actor.

Plot

In 1930, during Prohibition, the notorious gangland kingpin Al Capone supplies illegal liquor and nearly controls all of Chicago. Bureau of Prohibition agent Eliot Ness has been tasked with halting Capone's activities, but his first attempt at a liquor raid fails due to corrupt policemen alerting Capone. He then encounters veteran Irish-American officer James Malone, who opposes the rampant corruption and offers to help Ness, suggesting they find a man from the police academy who has not yet come under Capone's influence and still believes in the idealistic aspects of law enforcement. They recruit Italian-American trainee George Stone (birth name Giuseppe Petri) for his superior marksmanship and integrity. Joined by accountant Oscar Wallace, assigned to Ness from Washington, D.C., they successfully raid a Capone liquor warehouse and start gaining positive publicity, with the press dubbing them "The Untouchables". Capone later kills the warehouse manager with a  baseball bat to warn his other subordinates.

Discovering that Capone has not filed an income tax return for four years, Wallace suggests trying to build a tax evasion case against him (as Capone's network keeps him well-insulated from his other crimes). A crooked alderman offers Ness a bribe to drop his investigation, but Ness refuses. After Capone's enforcer Frank Nitti threatens to kill Ness's wife Catherine and their daughter, Ness immediately moves them to a safe house. In a subsequent raid on the Canadian border, Ness and his team intercept an incoming liquor shipment, killing several gangsters and capturing a Capone bookkeeper named George, whom they eventually persuade to testify against his employer. Back in Chicago, Nitti, dressed as a policeman, murders Wallace and George in the elevator of the police station and leaves a taunting message for Ness. Ness confronts Capone at the Lexington Hotel after the murders, but Malone intervenes, urging Ness to focus on persuading the district attorney not to dismiss the charges against Capone.

Realizing that police chief Mike Dorsett sold out Wallace and George, Malone forces Dorsett to reveal where Capone's accountant, Walter Payne, is hiding. That evening, one of Capone's men breaks into Malone's apartment; Malone chases him out with a shotgun, but Nitti ambushes him with a Tommy gun. Shortly afterwards, Ness and Stone arrive to find Malone mortally wounded; before he dies, Malone shows them which train Payne will take out of town. As the duo await Payne's arrival at Union Station, Ness sees a young mother with two suitcases and her child in a carriage laboriously climbing the lobby steps. Ness ultimately decides to assist her, but the gangsters guarding Payne appear as Ness and the woman reach the top of the stairs, and a bloody shootout occurs. Though outnumbered, Ness and Stone manage to capture Payne alive and kill all his escorts, keeping both the mother and child unharmed.

Later, when Payne testifies at Capone's trial, Ness observes that Capone appears strangely calm, and that Nitti is wearing a gun in the courtroom. The bailiff removes Nitti and searches him, finding a note from Chicago Mayor William Hale Thompson which effectively permits him to carry the weapon. However, noticing Nitti possesses a matchbook with Malone's address written inside, Ness realizes that Nitti killed Malone. Panicked, Nitti shoots the bailiff before fleeing to the courthouse roof, where Ness captures him. After Nitti insults the memory of Malone and gloats that he will escape conviction for the murder, an enraged Ness pushes Nitti off the roof to his death, avenging Wallace and Malone.

Stone gives Ness a list, taken from Nitti's coat, which shows that the jurors in the trial are all on Capone's payroll. Behind closed doors, Ness persuades the judge to switch Capone's jury with one hearing an unrelated divorce case by telling the judge that he is on Capone's payroll, and they can prove it. This prompts Capone's lawyer to enter a guilty plea, although an outraged Capone violently objects. Capone is later convicted of tax evasion and sentenced to eleven years in prison. On the day Capone begins serving his sentence, Ness closes up his office, giving Malone's St. Jude medallion and callbox key to Stone as a farewell present. As Ness leaves the police station, a reporter asks him what he will do upon the probable repeal of Prohibition, to which he replies, "I think I'll have a drink."

Cast

Background

Development 
Ned Tanen spent years trying to obtain the rights to Eliot Ness's life story while working as an executive at Universal Pictures in the 1970s and the 1980s. After becoming head of motion picture productions at Paramount Pictures, which owned the film and television rights to Ness's memoir The Untouchables, Tanen immediately hired Art Linson to begin producing a film adaptation. Linson was not interested in adapting the ABC television series based on Ness's book, and sought to create a more "serious, authentic" depiction of Ness's career in Chicago. Linson hired playwright David Mamet to compose an original script for the film. Most of Mamet's screenplay was used, but director Brian De Palma slightly rewrote some scenes during production in order to incorporate new locations. For instance, the scene paying homage to the Potemkin Stairs from Battleship Potemkin (1925) was moved from a hospital to Chicago Union Station. A month after the film was released, De Palma downplayed his own role on the script:

Being a writer myself, I don't like to take credit for things I didn't do. I didn't develop this script. David [Mamet] used some of my ideas and he didn't use some of them. I looked upon it more clinically, as a piece of material that has to be shaped, with certain scenes here or there. But as for the moral dimension, that's more or less the conception of the script, and I just implemented it with my skills – which are well developed. It's good to walk in somebody else's shoes for a while. You get out of your own obsessions; you are in the service of somebody else's vision, and that's a great discipline for a director.Linson and De Palma wanted to have more tender portrayal of Ness than Robert Stack's "tough" portrayal from the 1950s television series, seeking to portray him as a "vulnerable family man." De Palma initially wanted Don Johnson to portray Eliot Ness. Mickey Rourke, Jeff Bridges, William Hurt, Harrison Ford, and Michael Douglas also turned down the role. A 1985 issue of Variety announced the casting of Jack Nicholson as Ness, but he was ultimately replaced by Kevin Costner. In preparing for his role as Eliot Ness, Kevin Costner met with former FBI agent and Untouchable Al "Wallpaper" Wolff at his home in Lincolnwood for historical context and to learn about Ness's mannerisms.

Robert De Niro was De Palma's first choice to play Al Capone, but it was uncertain if he could appear in the film because of his appearance in the Broadway play Cuba and his Teddy Bear. De Palma met with Bob Hoskins to discuss the role in case De Niro could not appear. When De Niro took the part, De Palma mailed Hoskins a check for £20,000 with a "Thank You" note, which prompted Hoskins to call up De Palma and ask him if there were any more films he didn't want him to be in. Gene Hackman and Marlon Brando were also considered as options in case both De Niro and Hoskins proved unable to perform the role. De Niro's research for the role of Al Capone included reading about him and watching historical footage. He had one extra scene written for his character, and contacted Capone's original tailors to have identical suits and silk underwear made for him. He was paid $1.5 million for the role.

The character of the IRS agent Oscar Wallace was partially based on Frank J. Wilson, the IRS criminal investigator who spent years keeping tabs on Capone's financial dealings before laying charges. Unlike Wallace, Wilson was not killed during the investigation, and was later involved in the Lindbergh kidnapping case.

Filming 
Principal photography began on August 18, 1986, in Chicago, Illinois, where Ness's story begins with him recruiting his Untouchables team with the intent of taking down Capone. In August 1986, Paramount Pictures contacted Garry Wunderwald of the Montana Film Commissioner's Office to find a 1930-period bridge to imply a border crossing between the United States and Canada. Wunderwald suggested the Hardy Bridge, which crosses the Missouri River near the small town of Cascade, southwest of Great Falls.

From  the bridge was closed to traffic to film the shootout sequence. 25 local residents were cast to ride horseback as Royal Canadian Mounted Police during the scene. The crew then built cabins and summer homes along the river, and 600 trees were brought in from Lincoln and Kalispell areas, and planted in a day and a half. Several 1920s & 1930s-era vehicles were rented from ranchers from Conrad and Great Falls. Actual filming took approximately ten days, but the production staff reserved the bridge for enough time to allow for production delays. Hundreds were allowed to watch filming from a nearby field.

The railway station shoot-out is a homage to the "Odessa Steps" montage in Sergei Eisenstein's famous 1925 silent movie Battleship Potemkin, and was parodied in the 1994 movie Naked Gun : The Final Insult as a dream sequence.

Historical accuracy
While the film is based on historic events, most of the film is inaccurate or fictional; the raid at the Canada–United States border never happened, and neither did the courthouse or railway station shootouts, Ness did not kill Nitti, (he died by suicide in 1943, twelve years after the trial) and Ness's unit had very little to do with Capone's final tax evasion conviction. Perhaps the most significant creative liberty of the film is that in real life Capone had the Chicago Outfit actively avoid killing or even physically harming Ness and other Treasury agents sent to Chicago. Although Capone frequently tried to bribe them, he decided that violence against them would lead to greater retaliation from the federal government. Ness and Capone also never met in real life.

Reception
The Untouchables opened on June 3, 1987 in 1,012 theatres where it grossed $10,023,094 on its opening weekend and ranked the sixth-highest opening weekend of 1987. It went on to make $76.2 million in North America. According to producer Art Linson, the polls conducted for the film showed that approximately 50% of the audience were women. "Ordinarily, a violent film attracts predominantly men, but this is also touching, about redemption and relationships and because of that the audience tends to forgive the excesses when it comes to violence".

Critical response
The Untouchables received positive reviews from film critics. On Rotten Tomatoes, the film has an approval rating of 82% based on reviews from 71 critics, with an average rating of 7.60/10. The website's critical consensus reads, "Slick on the surface but loaded with artful touches, Brian DePalma's classical gangster thriller is a sharp look at period Chicago crime, featuring excellent performances from a top-notch cast." On Metacritic, the film has a weighted average score of 79 out of 100, based on 16 critics, indicating "generally favorable reviews". Audiences polled by CinemaScore gave the film an average grade of "A−" on an A+ to F scale.

Vincent Canby of The New York Times gave the film a positive review, calling it "a smashing work" and saying it was "vulgar, violent, funny and sometimes breathtakingly beautiful". Roger Ebert of the Chicago Sun-Times praised the film for its action sequences and locations, but disapproved of David Mamet's script and Brian De Palma's direction. Ebert singled out the film's depiction of Al Capone as arrogant and childish, to the point of misbehaving in public and in court, as the biggest disappointment of the film, while giving praise to Sean Connery's work. Hal Hinson, in his review for The Washington Post, also criticized De Palma's direction, saying "somehow we're put off here by the spectacular stuff he throws up onto the screen. De Palma's storytelling instincts have given way completely to his interest in film as a visual medium. His only real concern is his own style."

The New Yorkers Pauline Kael wrote that it was "not a great movie; it's too banal, too morally comfortable. The great gangster pictures don't make good and evil mutually exclusive, the way they are here [...] But it's a great audience movie—a wonderful potboiler." Richard Schickel of Time wrote, "Mamet's elegantly efficient script does not waste a word, and De Palma does not waste a shot. The result is a densely layered work moving with confident, compulsive energy". Time ranked it as one of the best films of 1987. Adrian Turner of Radio Times awarded it a full five stars, writing that "David Mamet's dialogue crackles, Ennio Morricone's music soars and the production design sparkles. Yet for many the main attraction of this modern classic is Sean Connery's Oscar-winning turn as the veteran Irish cop who shows Ness the ropes."

Despite receiving the Academy Award for Best Actor in a Supporting Role for his performance, Connery was voted first place in a 2003 Empire poll for worst film accent because his Scottish accent was still very noticeable.

Accolades

American Film Institute
 AFI's 100 Years...100 Movies – Nominated
 AFI's 100 Years...100 Thrills – Nominated
 AFI's 100 Years...100 Heroes and Villains:
 Al Capone – Nominated Villain
 Eliot Ness – Nominated Hero
 AFI's 100 Years of Film Scores – Nominated
 AFI's 10 Top 10 – Nominated (Gangster Film)

Video game
A side-scrolling video game, The Untouchables was released by Ocean Software in 1989 on multiple platforms. The game plays out some of the more significant parts of the film. Set in Chi-town, the primary goal of the game is to take down Al Capone's henchmen and eventually detain Capone.

References

External links

 
 
 
 
 The Untouchables (Special Collector's Edition) Blu-ray Disc Review at HD-Report
 

1987 films
1987 crime drama films
American crime drama films
Cultural depictions of Eliot Ness
Cultural depictions of Frank Nitti
American courtroom films
American police detective films
1980s English-language films
Films scored by Ennio Morricone
Films about the American Mafia
Films about prohibition in the United States
Films based on non-fiction books
Films based on television series
Films directed by Brian De Palma
Films featuring a Best Supporting Actor Academy Award-winning performance
Films featuring a Best Supporting Actor Golden Globe winning performance
Films produced by Art Linson
Films set in the 1930s
Films set in Chicago
Films set in Montana
Films shot in Chicago
Films shot in Montana
American gangster films
Paramount Pictures films
Royal Canadian Mounted Police in fiction
Films with screenplays by David Mamet
The Untouchables
Films about Al Capone
Films about the Chicago Outfit
Cultural depictions of Al Capone
Films about accountants
Films about Irish-American culture
Films about Italian-American culture
Films about Canada–United States relations
1980s American films